Zydus Wellness (previously Carnation Nutra-Analogue Foods) is an Indian consumer goods company headquartered in Ahmedabad, which produces nutrition and skincare products. It is a subsidiary of the pharmaceutical company Zydus Lifesciences (formerly known as Cadila Healthcare). Its brands include Glucon-D, Sugar Free, EverYuth Scrub, Peel-off, Complan and Nycil. The company operates three manufacturing plants, one in Gujarat and 2 in Sikkim.

History
Carnation Nutra-Analogue Foods was founded in 1994 as a producer of dairy substitutes. Over the next decade, its margarine product Nutralite became the largest selling margarine brand in India.

In 2006, Cadila Healthcare acquired a 14.96% stake in the company. Cadila's stake in the company increased to over 70% in 2008, after the merger of Cadila's consumer goods business, which included sugar substitute brand Sugar Free and EverYuth range of skincare products, into Carnation. The merged entity was then named as Zydus Wellness Limited in January 2009.

In 2009, the company began manufacturing men's grooming and skincare products. In 2011, Zydus Wellness launched its milk additive brand Actilife.

In 2017, Zydus Wellness developed stevia products as part of its sugar substitute business. In 2018, it launched its second sugar substitute brand called Sugarlite.

It also took over Heinz India's manufacturing facilities in Aligarh and Sitarganj.

In 2020, Zydus Wellness began to sell hand sanitisers and chocolate products.

References

Food and drink companies of India
Cosmetics companies of India
Manufacturing companies established in 1994
Health care companies of India
Manufacturing companies based in Ahmedabad
1994 establishments in Gujarat
Indian companies established in 1994
Companies listed on the National Stock Exchange of India
Companies listed on the Bombay Stock Exchange